Fulvio Nesti (8 June 1925 – 1 January 1996) was an Italian footballer who played as a midfielder.

Club career
Born in Lastra a Signa, Nesti played club football for ACF Fiorentina, S.S. Scafatese Calcio 1922, SPAL 1907, F.C. Internazionale Milano, and A.C. Prato.

International career
At international level, Nesti earned 5 caps and scored 1 goal for the Italy national team in 1953 and 1954, and participated in the 1954 FIFA World Cup.

External links

Statistics at FIGC.it
Profile at Enciclopediadelcalcio.it

1925 births
1996 deaths
People from Lastra a Signa
Italian footballers
Italy international footballers
1954 FIFA World Cup players
Serie A players
Serie B players
ACF Fiorentina players
S.S. Scafatese Calcio 1922 players
S.P.A.L. players
Inter Milan players
A.C. Prato players
Association football midfielders
Sportspeople from the Metropolitan City of Florence
Footballers from Tuscany